Stuart Brennan (born 8 October 1982) is a BAFTA-winning British actor, playwright, producer and director. He is an advocate for independent film, helping set up and establish film festivals across the world.

Early life and education
He was born on 8 October 1982 in Barnstaple, North Devon, to parents Nigel and Lorraine Brennan and has five brothers — Rob, Ollie, Clive, Leo and Kit.

Brennan attended Pilton Infants School, Pilton Bluecoats School, Pilton Community College, North Devon College then went on to study drama at the University of Winchester (formerly known as King Alfreds College).

Brennan was awarded a WBC Championship belt and made an honorary World Champion by the World Boxing Council in recognition of the five years he spent training for his portrayal of Howard Winstone in Risen, a part for which he also had to lose . In 2011, he was awarded a BAFTA Wales for Best Actor for the portrayal.

Writer – theatre 
Brennan's graduation stage theatre performance in A Little Silhouette of a Man, which he co-wrote and performed in with two other actors, was selected to premiere for the public at the prestigious Theatre Royal Winchester, to a sell-out crowd.

His next play, Coffee Mornings, was produced and directed by Peter Snee and premiered at the Stoke Repertory Theatre in a professional production for Theatre Giant. The play had strong reviews and the writing was described by one critic as Pinter-esque.

In 2013, Brennan wrote Houdini. He starred in the production as Theo Houdini. The play got strong reviews.

Writer – film & TV 
In 2002, Brennan wrote the horror film The Innocent which he also produced and directed. In 2004, Brennan wrote, directed and produced the short film The Blood We Cry, which aired on the BSKYB network. The film deals with a false accusation of racism and mistaken identity. 2004 also saw Brennan write the feature film The Lost.

In 2005, Brennan wrote and produced the short film The Fifteenth based on the life of boxer Howard Winstone in the 1960s. 2005 saw the first collaboration with Horrible Histories author Terry Deary, when he was hired to adapt the best-selling trilogy of books The Fire Thief into a feature film.

In 2006, Brennan wrote the feature film Risen, which he produced with Neil Jones, who also directed it. In 2007, Brennan was hired by Sunipa Pictures to write on spec the feature script Life of Scars, which is yet to be produced. 

In 2009-10, Brennan was hired by Green Leaf Film Studios in Chengdu, China to adapt 26 episodes of Terry Deary's True Time Tales best-selling books for TV. The directors of the studio were so impressed with Brennan they hired him for 18 months to help set up the VFX and Animation studio. He directed and produced the 30-minute 3D-animated pilot episode of True Time Tales. He also wrote a series of twelve short episodes of adaptations of classic fables, entitled Fantastic Fables and oversaw the production of the two-minute 2D animated pilot episode. In 2010, he also wrote 8 episodes of a Chinese-based mobile phone TV series, entitled Dynasty for the studio.

Brennan was approached and commissioned in the same year to write a short film about London boxer Terry Spinks, who was portrayed in the film Risen. 2012 saw Brennan collaborate with actor Sebastian Street and write the film Tomorrow. The movie went into production in 2014.
That same year, Brennan wrote two other scripts, the dark horror A Backpacker, which is currently being produced by Ridley Scott.

The beginning of 2014 saw Brennan write and direct zombie thriller Plan Z, produced by Imaginarium Tower and Zoghogg Entertainment and featuring himself, Brooke Burfitt and Victoria Morrison. It was released in 2016.

2015 Brennan wrote a modern adaptation of A Christmas Carol. It was released at Christmas 2018. 2018 also saw the release of his follow up directorial effort, The Necromancer.

Director – film & TV 

Brennan has directed the following feature films:

Getting High With Leo – drama – 2002 (student film)
The Innocent – horror – 2003 (student film)
Plan Z – horror – 2016
The Necromancer – horror – filmed in 2016/17.
Wolf – horror – 2018

Brennan has directed the following TV shows or short films for TV:

The Blood We Cry – drama – 2004 (student film)
 Terry Deary's True Time Tales – The Magic & The Mummy –  3D animation – 2010
Fantastic Fables – The Fox and the Crow – 2D animation – 2010

Brennan has also directed the following music videos:

Inside Out – for The New Electric, a Canadian pop band.
Journey's End – for Roger Taylor, of Queen fame.

Festival Official Selections

Producer – film & TV 

Brennan set up and ran Burn Hand Film Productions from 2001 until 2014, he also has set up and worked with British Phoenix Films, Studio 82, Jumping Tiger Inc. and Imaginarium Tower.

He has worked and developed projects in England, Scotland, Wales, Ireland, Germany, New Zealand, China, United States, Italy, Mexico, Spain and Canada.

In 2004 he produced a corporate film for Microsoft, which Bill Gates introduced at his Atlanta conference that year. He also produced a corporate film for the NHS in 2008.

He has worked as a producer on numerous short films and feature films.

2016 his movie Plan Z was released to critical and commercial success. It played theatrically at eleven cinemas in the UK and was released on iTunes, GooglePlay and on DVD in ASDA in 2017. Top horror critic MJ Simpson called it "One of the top horror films of 2016."

In 2018 he produced and directed the movie Wolf.

Actor – university 

Brennan graduated university from the University of Winchester in 2004, achieving a 2:1 degree with honours in Drama.

Actor – theatre 

In 2004 Brennan performed as one of the leads in A Little Silhouette of a Man at the Theatre Royal Winchester. Brennan then toured the South West of the UK with a production by Wessex Actors Company, as the lead role in Does Santa Really Dream of Reindeer. The show played 13 venues across the region and was well reviewed.

He teamed up again with the Wessex Actors Company in 2005 for a larger scale tour of The Mayor of Casterbridge in a lead supporting role as Donald Farfrae, directed by Michael Barry. The play toured 18 venues across Dorset, Devon, Cornwall and Somerset.

2006 saw Brennan take the stage in Joe Flavin's production of Blue in Camden, London, as one of three actors dealing with the loss of their friend.

In 2008 at the Edinburgh Fringe Festival, Brennan drew rave reviews for his "brilliantly convincing" performance in the two hander The Open Couple playing opposite Jennifer Sarah Dean and directed by Peter Snee. There were also performances in London.

In 2012 he gave his voice to a recorded version, performed live with puppets of A Christmas Carol, performing the role of Bob Cratchett, directed by Peter Snee.

In 2013 he performed as Theo Houdini in the lead role of the play Houdini in the UK & Ireland Tour. Although the play drew mixed reviews, including a strong four-star review from The Stage, Brennan for the most part was praised, with comparisons being made to a young De Niro, Brando and even Daniel Day-Lewis.

In 2016 he was the lead role of Professor Goodman in the national Australian tour of Ghost Stories, directed by Jennifer Sarah Dean and Peter Snee. The play earned strong reviews and sold out many of its dates as it toured Melbourne, Adelaide, Wagga Wagga, Canberra, Perth and Geelong.

Actor – film 

Brennan won a BAFTA in 2011 for his performance in Risen. He was the youngest-ever recipient of the Award and the first Englishman to ever win the BAFTA Cymru for Best Actor.

The World Boxing Council also recognised Brennan's portrayal of the boxer Howard Winstone and his commitment to portraying the boxing accurately in the film, by making him an honorary World Champion and Head of the WBC Mauricio Sauliman presented him with an authentic championship belt.

Risen took 5 years to make, due to financing issues and Brennan trained the entire time, so that once filming took place for the fight sequences he could actually spar for real with the other boxers in the film—most of whom were played by world boxing champions, including five-time world champion Érik Morales. Brennan dropped  to portray the featherweight boxer Howard Winstone. For the Welsh accent, Brennan spent 6 months before filming speaking all the time in a Welsh accent and continued for two years, during the projects hiatus. On set and during filming, he stayed in his accent the whole time, whenever filming took place.

In the film The Reverend, Brennan, who portrays the title character, the Reverend, actually became an ordained reverend, after taking an online course. He also read the bible and attended church services.

In 2018, he appeared in the film Tomorrow. His 2018 performance as Ebenezer Scrooge was not ranked in an article by The Independent ranking the top 5 performances of this character on film.

Film festivals 

In 2008 Brennan set up The Newport International Film Festival, to help support and foster filmmaking and exhibition opportunities for filmmakers in Wales. For the first two years he personally covered all of the costs of the event, giving free entry to filmmakers and free admission to the public.

In 2010 he established The Film Festival Guild and set up two new festivals, including The British Independent Film Festival and the British Horror Film Festival. 

In 2013, the Universal Film Magazine exposed the fact that Brennan have been giving awards to himself at The Film Festival Guild for years.

References

External links

 Twitter
 Official Facebook Page

1982 births
Living people
English male film actors
Mass media people from Barnstaple
Male actors from Devon